Ruggero Cappuccio (born January 19, 1964)  is an Italian playwright.  He was born in Torre del Greco.

Opera

 Delirio  marginale, 1994 (Premio IDI Autori Nuovi, 1993)
 Shakespea Re di Napoli, 1994, Rome, 1997 (Premio Speciale Drammaturgia Europea, 1994)
 Mai più amore per sempre, 1995
 Desideri mortali, un oratorio profano per Tomasi di Lampedusa, Roma, 1998
 Tieste e Bacchidi, Roma, 1998
 Il sorriso di San Giovanni, Rome, 1998 (Premio Ubu Migliore Novità Italiana, 1998, Premio Candoni)
 Edipo a Colono, Trieste, 1996 e Torino, 2001
 Paolo Borsellino essendo stato, 2006
 La notte dei due silenzi, Palermo, 2007

References

Italian dramatists and playwrights
1964 births
Living people
People from Torre del Greco